Søren Wulff Johansson (born 26 August 1971 in Hals, Denmark) is a Danish former decathlete. He was the first Danish person to receive a lifetime ban from sport, after failing doping tests for anabolic steroids in 1989 and 1995.

Johansson was a two-time Danish Athletics Championships. He was the athletics pentathlon champion in 1994 and the decathlon champion in 1995. His personal best performance in the decathlon was 6982 points.

He was a member of several athletics clubs: Aalborg AK until 1989, Trongården in the 1991/1992 season, Sparta Athletics in 1993 and Copenhagen Idræts Forening 1994/1995.

National titles
Danish Athletics Championships
Pentathlon: 1994
Decathlon: 1995

References

Living people
1971 births
People from Aalborg Municipality
Danish decathletes
Danish male athletes
Doping cases in athletics
Danish sportspeople in doping cases
Sportspeople banned for life
Sportspeople from the North Jutland Region